Kurofune (Japanese クロフネ, 31 March 1998 - 17 January 2021) was an American-bred, Japanese-trained Thoroughbred racehorse and sire who won Grade 1 races on both turf and dirt. He showed promising form as a juvenile in 2000 when he won two of four races and ran third in a very strong edition of the Radio Tampa Hai Sansai Stakes. In the following year he took the Mainichi Hai and the NHK Mile Cup in spring on turf before being switched to dirt racing in late autumn and winning the Musashino Stakes and the Japan Cup Dirt. He won six of his ten races, four of them in track record times, before his track career was ended by injury. After his retirement from racing he became a very successful breeding stallion.

Background
Kurofune was a grey horse bred in Kentucky by Nicholas M. Lotz. In September 1999 the yearling was put up for auction at Keeneland and was bought for $70,000 by BNK Stable. In the following year he was consigned to the Fasig-Tipton Florida Select 2-Year-Olds In Training sale at which he was purchased by Katsumi Yoshida for $430,000. The colt was exported to Japan where he entered the ownership of Makoto Kaneko and was sent into training with Kunihide Matsuda.

He was sired by French Deputy who recorded his biggest win in the 1995 Jerome Handicap. As a breeding stallion, the best of his other progeny included Left Bank, Nobo Jack (JBC Sprint), Reginetta (Oka Sho), Admire Jupter (Tenno Sho) and Eishin Deputy (Takarazuka Kinen).

Kurofune's dam Blue Avenue, from whom he inherited his grey colour, showed some racing ability, winning five of her twenty races. She was a half-sister to the Vanity Handicap winner Brought To Mind and a great-great-granddaughter of the New Zealand mare Chubin whose other descendants included the Melbourne Cup winner Silver Knight.

The term kurofune derives from the Black Ships, a name given to Western vessels arriving in Japan in the 16th and 19th centuries.

Racing career

2000: two-year-old season
Kurofune's first two runs were at Kyoto Racecourse in the autumn of 2000. After finishing third in a maiden race over 1600 metres on 14 October he then set a track record when he won a similar event over 2000 metres two weeks later. He then appeared at Hanshin Racecourse on 3 December and set another track record when he won the 2000 metres Erica Sho. Later that month at the same venue he was stepped up in class for the Grade 3 Radio Tampa Hai Sansai Stakes and came home third of the twelve runners behind Agnes Tachyon and Jungle Pocket.

2001: three-year-old season
On 24 March at Hanshin, Kurofune recorded his first major win when he was a wide-margin winner of the Grade 3 Mainichi Hai over 2000 metres. On his next appearance the colt was brought back to 1600 metres and promoted to Grade 1 level for the NHK Mile Cup at Tokyo Racecourse on 6 May when his opponents included Kitasan Channel (New Zealand Trophy), Kachidoki Ryu (Crystal Cup), Shower Party (Kyoto Nisai Stakes), Shower Party (Daily Hai Sansai Stakes) and T M Southpaw (Keio Hai Sansai Stakes). Ridden by Yutaka Take he won by half a length from Grass Eiko O with three lengths back to the filly Summer Candle in third. Kurofune was moved up in distance for the Tokyo Yushun over 2400 metres three weeks later and came home fifth of the eighteen runners behind Jungle Pocket, Dantsu Flame, Dancing Color and Born King.

Following the summer break Kurofune returned in September for the Kobe Shimbun Hai (a trial race for the Kikuka Sho) over 2000 metres at Hanshin and ran third behind Air Eminem and Sunrise Pegasus. Having raced on turf in all of his previous races, Kurofune was switched to the dirt for the Grade 3 Musashino Stakes over 1600 metres at Tokyo on 27 October, winning from Eagle Cafe (2000 NHK Mile Cup) in a new track record of 1:33.3. On 24 November Kurofune was matched against older horses when he contested the Grade 1 Japan Cup Dirt over 2100 metres at Tokyo and started the 0.7/1 favourite ahead of the American challenger Lido Palace. The other fourteen runners included Wing Arrow (winner of the race in the previous year and twice winner of the JRA Award for Best Dirt Horse), Miracle Opera (Mercury Cup), Regular Member (JBC Classic), Nobo True (February Stakes), Generous Rosi (Gordon Richards Stakes), Hagino High Grade (Tokai Stakes) and King of Tara (Prix Eugène Adam). Ridden by Take, Kurofune settled behind the leaders, took the lead on the final turn and drew right away in the straight to win by seven lengths from Wing Arrow. Lido Palace's rider Jerry Bailey commented "[Kurofune] was going so easy. He passed me without any effort, and my horse had no fight in him when the gray horse came to him".

In December it was announced that Kurofune had sustained a serious injury to the tendons in his right foreleg and that he would be unable to race again.
 
In January 2002 Kurofune was voted Best Dirt Horse in the JRA Awards for 2001.

Stud record
After his retirement from racing Kurofune stood as a breeding stallion at the Shadai Stallion Station before being withdrawn from stud duty in 2019. He was among the top ten sires in Japan on ten occasions and was the most successful sire of Japanese dirt runners in 2009 and 2010. He has also sired several rare white foals when bred to the broodmare Shirayukihime. Kurofune is the damsire of Chrono Genesis and the Victoria Mile winner Normcore. Kurofune died on 17 January 2021.

Major winners
c = colt, f = filly, g = gelding

Pedigree

References

1998 racehorse births
Racehorses bred in Kentucky
Racehorses trained in Japan
Thoroughbred family 2-r
2021 racehorse deaths